Maria Catherine Price La Touche (15 December 1824 – 21 November 1906) was an Irish novelist. 

Maria Catherine Price was born on 15 December 1824 at Desart Court in County Kilkenny, Ireland.  She was the daughter of Rose Lambart Price, eldest son of Sir Rose Price, 1st Baronet, and Catherine O'Connor, widow of John Otway Cuffe, 2nd Earl of Desart.

In 1843, she married John La Touche, son of Robert La Touche. They lived at Harristown.  They had three children: Emily (born 1844), Percy (born 1846), and Rose (born 1849). Rose La Touche became the object of the "crazed infatuation" of critic John Ruskin, though his offers of marriage were refused. 

Maria La Touche's literary career began with a poem she published at age twelve.  In the 1850s she published two novels.  Margaret Ferrier Young wrote that they were written "more as an amusement than for graver reasons. Perhaps because of this they were not successful, and are now quite forgotten."  She also published poetry and essays on various topics.

Maria Price La Touche died on 21 November 1906 in Dublin.

A selection of her correspondence was published in 1908 as The letters of noble woman: Mrs. La Touche of Harristown, edited by Margaret Ferrier Young.

Bibliography 

 The Clintons: or, Deeps and Shallows of Life.  3 vol.  London: Bentley, 1853.
 Lady Willoughby: or, The Double Marriage.  3 vol.  London: Hurst and Blackett, 1855.
 The letters of noble woman: Mrs. La Touche of Harristown, 1908.

References

External links
  

Created via preloaddraft
1824 births
1906 deaths
Irish women novelists